St. Joseph's Church ( or Josephskapelle) was a Roman Catholic church in the Ponarth quarter of Königsberg, Germany dedicated to Saint Joseph.

By 1930, the working-class quarter Ponarth south of center city Königsberg included the Protestant Ponarth Church but lacked a Catholic parish. The new St. Joseph's Church was built along Brandenburger Straße in 1931 and dedicated in 1932.

The church survived the 1944 Bombing of Königsberg and the 1945 Battle of Königsberg; the city became part of the Soviet Union after World War II and renamed as Kaliningrad. The building is now used for residential housing.

References

1931 establishments in Germany
1945 disestablishments in Germany
Roman Catholic churches in Kaliningrad
Churches in Kaliningrad Oblast
Joseph
Roman Catholic churches completed in 1931
Cultural heritage monuments of regional significance in Kaliningrad Oblast